WHBU (1240 AM) is a radio station  broadcasting a full-service oldies format. Licensed to Anderson, Indiana, United States, the station serves the Muncie-Marion area.  The station is currently owned by Woof Boom Radio Muncie License LLC.

WHBU is the longest running commercial radio station in Anderson.

History
WHBU's first license was granted on March 20, 1925, to B. L. Bing's Sons at 1002 Meridian Street in Anderson. The call letters were randomly assigned from an alphabetic roster of available call signs. A few months later the station owner was changed to joint ownership by the Riviera Theatre and Bing's Clothing, while still located at 1002 Meridian Street. In 1927 the owner became the Citizens Bank, and in late 1931 ownership was transferred to the Anderson Broadcasting Corporation. For much of its history the station was located, along with a now-razed rooftop transmitting tower, at the Citizens Bank Building on Meridian Plaza in downtown Anderson.

On November 11, 1928, as part of a national reassignment coordinated by implementation of the Federal Radio Commission's General Order 40, WHBU was assigned to 1210 kHz. In March 1941 a further reallocation, under the provisions of the North American Regional Broadcasting Agreement, reassigned the station to its current frequency of 1240 kHz. The station affiliated with the CBS Radio Network until its sale in 1998.

It was a stand-alone AM with a full service middle of the road format before becoming clustered with Muncie area stations operated by Indiana Radio Partners. WAXT (now WBKQ) licensed to nearby Alexandria would later join the cluster. A gradual trend towards soft adult contemporary music took place beginning in the mid-1970s, which was reflected in its jingle package "Reaching Out, Touching You" produced by Pepper-Tanner Productions in Memphis. Its main competition was the former WHUT (AM) with a Top 40 (and later a country) format and the original WLHN "Stereo 98" as its FM sister with an easy listening format, which are now WRPU and WGNR-FM with a gospel format owned by Moody Broadcasting.

On May 1, 2019 WHBU switched from news/talk to a full-service format, centered on oldies while maintaining a local talk morning show, Mitch In The Morning, and other local talk shows and elements.

References

External links

FCC History Cards for WHBU (covering 1927–1979)
Old radio tower demolition with photos

HBU
Radio stations established in 1925
1925 establishments in Indiana
Oldies radio stations in the United States
Full service radio stations in the United States